Lormont-Lauriers tram stop is located on line A of the Tramway de Bordeaux, and served as terminus of the northern branch of that line between 21 December 2003, when the line opened, and 31 June 2008, when the branch was extended to La Gardette - Bassens - Carbon Blanc. The stop is located in the commune of Lormont and is operated by the TBC.

For most of the day on Mondays to Fridays, trams run every ten minutes in both directions through the stop. Services run less frequently in the early morning, late evenings, weekends and public holidays.

References

Bordeaux tramway stops
Tram stops in Lormont
Railway stations in France opened in 2003